Miroslav Ivanov may refer to:

 Miroslav Ivanov (writer) (1929–1999), Czech nonfiction writer
 Miroslav Ivanov (footballer) (born 1981), Bulgarian footballer
 Miroslav Ivanov (musician) (born 1975), Bulgarian guitar player